Ilha de Santa Bárbara is the largest island in the Abrolhos Archipelago and the only inhabited island in Brazil that has infrastructure, being  long,  wide and  above sea level, it belongs to the Brazilian Navy and is not included in the limits of Abrolhos Marine National Park nor under its jurisdiction and because it is a military base, the disembarkation is expressly prohibited, being allowed only with authorization of the II Naval District, located in Salvador.

A chapel was built in honor of Saint Barbara, and a small classroom was also built that serves children, children of sailors who live there with their family. There are other constructions such as a boat garage, a helipad and a striking French-made lighthouse, perched on the highest point of the island, inaugurated in 1861 during the reign of Pedro II.

See also
List of islands of Brazil

References

External links

Atlantic islands of Brazil
Landforms of Bahia